Niceland (Population. 1.000.002) is a 2004 Icelandic drama directed by Friðrik Þór Friðriksson.

Cast
 Martin Compston as Jed
 Gary Lewis as Max
 Peter Capaldi as John
 Kerry Fox as Mary
 Shauna Macdonald as Sandra
 Guðrún María Bjarnadóttir as Chloe (as Gudrun Maria Bjarnadottir)
 Guðrún Gísladóttir as Ruth (as Gudrun Gisladottir)
 Timmy Lang as Alex
 Ásta S. Ólafsdóttir as Mia
 Hugrún Þorfinnsdóttir as Diana
 Gísli Örn Garðarsson as Ethan
 Páll Sigþór Pálsson as Newsreader
 Þorsteinn J. Vilhjálmsson as News Reporter
 Andri Freyr Hilmarsson as Factory Worker
 Halldór Halldórsson as Factory Worker (as Halldór Steinn Halldórsson)
 Helga Pálína Sigurðardóttir as Factory Worker
 Helgi Hrafn Pálsson as Factory Worker
 Hlynur Steinarsson as Factory Worker
 Margrét Eiríksdóttir as Factory Worker
 Sigurþór Dan as Factory Worker
 Steve Hudson as Ikea Employee
 Steinunn Þorvaldsdóttir as Factory Worker
 Jón Ingi Hákonarson as Bus Driver
 Sigurður Skúlason as Middle Aged Driver
 Kristinn Vilbergsson as Young Driver
 Svana Friðriksdóttir as Woman in Flower Shop
 Sigríður Jóna Þórisdóttir as Woman in Bus
 Benóný Ægisson as Couple in Electric Store
 Júlía Hannam as Couple in Electric Store
 Birgitta Birgisdóttir as Bakery Assistant
 Thor Sigurjonsson as Couple in Bakery 
 Line Lind as Couple in Bakery
 Kristin Ingveldur Ingólfsdóttir as Old Woman in Bakery
 Erlendur Eiríksson as Radio Hoste

Release
Niceland was released on 5 July 2004.

Awards
Edda Awards, Iceland 
 In 2004, Niceland won the ‘Edda Award’ for Screenplay of the Year, for Huldar Breiðfjörð.  
 In 2004 they were nominated for a ‘Edda Award’ for Best Film.

Karlovy Vary International Film Festival 
 In 2004, Niceland was nominated for a ‘Crystal Globe’ award for Friðrik Þór Friðriksson

References

External links

2004 drama films
2004 films
English-language Icelandic films
English-language Danish films
English-language German films
Films directed by Friðrik Þór Friðriksson